Billions is a lost 1920 American silent comedy film produced by and starring Alla Nazimova and distributed by Metro Pictures. Ray Smallwood directed. It is based on a French play, L'Homme riche, by Jean Jose Frappa and Henry Dupuy-Mazuel.

Cast
Alla Nazimova - Princess Triloff
Charles Bryant - Krakerfeller / Owen Carey
William J. Irving - Frank Manners
Victor Potel - Pushkin
John Steppling - Isaac Colben
Marian Skinner - Mrs. Colben
Emmett King - John Blanchard
Eugene H. Klum - The Bellboy

References

External links

allmovie/synopsis; Billions
Lantern slide for Billions 

1920 films
American silent feature films
Lost American films
American films based on plays
1920 comedy films
Silent American comedy films
American black-and-white films
Metro Pictures films
1920 lost films
Lost comedy films
Films directed by Ray Smallwood
1920s American films